Kalahandi University, formerly Government Autonomous College is a state public university located in Bhawanipatna, the district headquarters of Kalahandi district of Odisha, India

History
The University started as Kalahandi Science College on 18 July 1960 under private management till 30 September 1961. Subsequently, it was taken over by the Government of Odisha on 1 December 1961 as Government Science College. The degree classes started in the year 1982. It was conferred with Autonomous status in the year 2002. On 1 September 2020, it was upgraded to an affiliating university by the Odisha state government as Kalahandi University. The University caters as a higher educational centre in the KBK (Kalahandi-Bolangir-Koraput) region.

Academics
The Institution offers UG, PG and P.H.D courses in 16 different subjects.

 Anthropology	
 Botany	
 Chemistry	
 Commerce	
 Economics	
 Education	
 English	
 Geography	
 History	
 Mathematics	
 Odia	
 Physics	
 Political Science	
 Sanskrit	
 Sociology	
 Zoology

Affiliated colleges
The university has jurisdiction over colleges in Kalahandi and Nuapada district.

References

Department of Higher Education, Odisha
Autonomous Colleges of Odisha
Universities and colleges in Odisha
Kalahandi district
1960 establishments in Orissa
Educational institutions established in 1960